Oğuzhan Kefkir (born 27 August 1991) is a German professional footballer who plays for Rot-Weiss Essen as a midfielder.

Career
Born in Wuppertal, Kefkir began his career in 1997 with SV Bayer Wuppertal 04. In 2002, he joined VfL Bochum's youth academy. He made his Bundesliga debut for VfL Bochum on 3 April 2010 against SC Freiburg. On 27 May 2010, he signed his first professional contract for VfL Bochum and was promoted from the U-19 team.

Career statistics

References

Kefkir ist zurück in Dortmund, kicker.de, 2 December 2015

External links
 
 

1991 births
Living people
German people of Turkish descent
Sportspeople from Wuppertal
Association football midfielders
German footballers
Footballers from North Rhine-Westphalia
Bundesliga players
2. Bundesliga players
3. Liga players
Alemannia Aachen players
VfL Bochum players
VfL Bochum II players
Borussia Dortmund II players
VfR Aalen players
KFC Uerdingen 05 players
Rot-Weiss Essen players